PNC Center, formerly National City Center and often still known by its original name, the Top of Troy, is a high-rise office building in Troy, Michigan. The complex consists of a 25-story triangular office tower and a two-floor atrium containing offices, retail, and a conference center. Completed in 1975, the International-style tower is the tallest building in Troy and among the tallest in Oakland County, standing 346 feet tall with 667,000 square feet of office space. PNC Financial Services maintains regional offices in the building as the major tenant.

The building can be easily accessed from Interstate 75, as it is located just west of the interchange (exit 69) with Big Beaver Road.  The Top of Troy can be seen for miles from much of the Metro Detroit area. There is a Ruth's Chris Steak House on the first floor, as well as a cafeteria known as Friends Café.

See also

Architecture of metropolitan Detroit
Metro Detroit
Tourism in metropolitan Detroit

Notes

References

External links 
 
 

Skyscrapers in Troy, Michigan
Commercial buildings completed in 1975
1975 establishments in Michigan
Skyscraper office buildings in Michigan
International style architecture in Michigan